Úštěk Synagogue is a synagogue in the town of Úštěk in the Ústí nad Labem Region of the Czech Republic.

The modest, Baroque synagogue is made of sandstone from a nearby quarry. The current structure was built shortly after the previous building was destroyed in a fire in 1793. It was in use until the Second World War. It survived the war, but the adjacent houses were torn down and the synagogue was allowed to deteriorate during the post-war period. The roof decayed, and the interior furnishings were burned. It was renovated by the Jewish Museum of Prague in a project that began in 1997 and was completed in 2003, supported by the state and by the town of Úštěk.

References

External links

Baroque synagogues in the Czech Republic
18th-century synagogues
Litoměřice District